Kate Patrick is a fictional character from the British Channel 4 soap opera Hollyoaks, played by Natasha Symms. She debuted on-screen during the episodes airing in 1997. She departed in 2000 and returned for guest appearances in 2002 and 2003.

Casting
Dannielle Brent who plays Symms on-screen sister Gina Patrick originally auditioned for the role of Kate.

Storylines
When their mother Jill Patrick (Lynda Rooke) married Jack Osborne (Jimmy McKenna), Kate along with her siblings Gina and Sol Patrick (Paul Danan) acquired step-siblings in the form of stuck-up Ruth (Terri Dwyer) and Darren Osborne (Ashley Taylor Dawson), who they refused to get along with. Ruth's attitude towards her family riled Kate, and as revenge, she taught her a lesson she wouldn't forget by seducing and having an affair with her husband Kurt Benson, effectively destroying their marriage.

Kate earned a reputation in the village as the wicked step-sister, but she couldn't have cared less as she had serious family issues to contend with. Firstly, her mother admitted that Gina and Sol were not her biological children but had brought them up as her own when their real mother died. The biggest bombshell for Kate was that she had a long lost twin brother, Joe Johnson (James McKenzie Robinson), who she had never known. When Joe arrived in the village, Kate rejected him, but soon warmed up to him. Unfortunately, there was an attraction between them which they could not shake and they shared a kiss.

Ruth and Carol Groves (Natalie Casey) spread rumors that they were having an incestuous affair. Kate exacted revenge by stealing Carol's diary and photocopying pages and sticking them in the phone box for everyone to see. She then gave Ruth laxatives before her housewarming party, then hid all the toilet paper, and let all her friends and family in and left them to it. Joe's feelings for Kate grew stronger by the day, and realising that she couldn't cope with being so close to him anymore, Kate said a tearful goodbye to Jill, Gina, Sol and Jack before breaking the news to Joe that she was leaving. Kate later returned to help her brother Sol get back on his feet after being made homeless by Jack, and also for Jill's funeral.

Reception
Merle Brown of the Daily Record said that The Patrick family became a mess and said Hollyoaks was "unmissable" when they all suffered an identity crisis.

References

Hollyoaks characters
Fictional twins
Television characters introduced in 1997
Female characters in television
Female villains